Red is a Cantopop album by Leslie Cheung first released in 1996. The album was Cheung's second post-"retirement" album and incorporated multiple genres including smooth jazz, and trip hop, producing a distinct music style from Cheung's earlier albums.

The lyrics of all the songs were penned by lyricist, Albert Leung. Red is the only such album published by Cheung. The album also featured Cheung's first collaboration with C.Y. Kong.

Track listing
 "Prologue[Red]" – 0:12
 偷情 "Love by Stealth" – 4:56
 有心人 "A Man of Intention" – 5:11
 還有誰 "Who Else?" – 3:24
 談情說愛 "Whispers of Love" – 3:52
 你我之間 "You and Me" – 4:10
 怨男 "Grieving Man" – 3:40
 怪你過份美麗 "Blamefully Beautiful" – 4:55
 不想擁抱我的人 "The One Who Doesn't Want to Hold Me" – 3:51
 意猶未盡 "Longing For More" – 3:42
 紅 "Red" – 4:42
 Boulevard of Broken Dreams" – 3:35 (Japan version)
 Holding Deeply" – (Mainland China version)

Personnel
Leslie Cheung - vocals, background vocals
Adrian Chan - background vocals, guitar
Alex San - grand piano
Melchior Sarreal - drum
Miguel S. Ignot- saxophone
Joey Tang - guitar
Lam Chi Wang - bass
Tulloch Sound Orchestra - Strings
Albert - background vocals
Nancy - background vocals
Jacky - background vocals
Isabella - background vocals
Patrick Lui - background vocals
May - background vocals

Production
Producer: Leslie Cheung, Alvin Leong
Recording/Mixing: Adrian Chan, John Lin, David Ling JR [Studio S&R], Geen, Randy[Tang Lou], Bryan Choy[Avon Studio]
Programming: C.Y.Kong, Adrian Chan
Music arranger: Alex San, C.Y. Kong
Cover Design: Wing Shya of Double X Workshop
Photography: Lawerce Ching
Mastering Engineer: John Lin

References

Leslie Cheung albums
1996 albums